Time's Raging is a 1985 Australian television film directed by Sophia Turkiewicz and starring  Judy Morris and Penne Hackforth-Jones. The screenplay concerns a 38-year-old woman who wants a baby.

References

External links
Time's Raging at Peter Malone

Contemporary review at Sydney Morning Herald

Australian television films
1985 television films
1985 films
Works by Frank Moorhouse
1980s English-language films